Mary K. Andrews (1854–1914) was an Irish geologist, notable as one of the first women to be active in this area.

Life
Born in Belfast, Mary Andrews was one of six children born to Jane Hardie and the chemist Thomas Andrews. She was Honorary Secretary of the geological section of the Belfast Naturalists' Field Club (BNFC) after its establishment in 1893. A friend and collaborator of Sydney Mary Thompson, Andrews photographed features of special interest for the British Association, and curated the BNFC's local geological specimens.

She represented Queen's College, Belfast and the BNFC at the 1907 centenary celebrations of the Geological Society.

Works
 (as K.) The Early History of Magnetism, Nature, 27 April 1876.
 'Denudation at Cultra, County Down' [1892], Irish Naturalist 2 (1893), pp. 16–18; 47-49; Belfast Field Club Reports 3 (1893), pp. 529–32
 'Dykes in Antrim and Down', Irish Naturalist 3 (1894), pp. 93–6
 'Erosion at Newcastle', Irish Naturalist, 10, 114
 'Notes on Moel Tryfaen' [1894], Belfast Field Club Reports 4 (1901), pp. 205–10

References

British geologists
Scientists from Belfast
1854 births
1914 deaths
Irish women scientists
Irish women geologists